is a village located in Fukushima Prefecture, Japan. , the village had an estimated population of 6,265 in 2179 households, and a population density of 180 persons per km².

Geography
Izumizaki is located in the flatlands of south-central Fukushima prefecture.

Neighboring municipalities
 Fukushima Prefecture
 Shirakawa
 Nakajima
 Yabuki

Demographics
Per Japanese census data, the population of Izumizaki has remained relatively stable over the past 80 years.

Climate
Izumizaki has a humid climate (Köppen climate classification Cfa).
Rivers: Abukuma River, Izumi River

History
The area of present-day Izumizaki was part of ancient Mutsu Province and the area has many burial mounds from the Kofun period. The area was divided between part of the holdings of Shirakawa Domain, Kasama Domain and tenryō territory held directly by the Tokugawa shogunate during the Edo period. After the Meiji Restoration, it was organized as part of Nishishirakawa District in the Nakadōri region of Iwaki Province. The villages of Izumizaki and Sekihira were established with the creation of the modern municipalities system on April 1, 1889. The two villages merged in 1954.

Economy
The economy of Izumizaki is primarily agricultural.

Education
Izumizaki has two public elementary schools and one public junior high school operated by the village government. The village does not have a high school.
 Izumizaki Middle School
Izumizaki First Elementary School
Izumizaki Second Elementary School

Transportation

Railway
JR East – Tōhoku Main Line

Highway

Local attractions
Izumizaki Cave Tomb (National Historic Site) 
Shirakawa Kanga ruins (National Historic Site)
Izumisaki International Cycling Stadium

Noted people from Izumizaki
Tamanoshima Arata, sumo wrestler

References

External links

 

 
Villages in Fukushima Prefecture